The 24th Field Artillery Regiment "Peloritani" ) is a field artillery regiment of the Italian Army. Today the regiment is based in Messina in Sicily and operationally assigned to the Mechanized Brigade "Aosta".

Current Structure
As of 2019 the 24th Field Artillery Regiment "Peloritani" consists of:

  Regimental Command, in Messina
 Command and Logistic Support Battery
 Surveillance, Target Acquisition and Tactical Liaison Battery
 1st Artillery Group
 1st Howitzer Battery
 2nd Howitzer Battery
 3rd Howitzer Battery
 Fire and Technical Support Battery 

The Command and Logistic Support Battery fields the following sections: C3 Section, Transport and Materiel Section, Medical Section, and Commissariat Section. The regiment is equipped with FH-70 towed howitzers. The Surveillance, Target Acquisition and Tactical Liaison Battery is equipped with RQ-11B Raven unmanned aerial vehicles and ARTHUR counter-battery radars.

See also 
 Mechanized Brigade "Aosta"

External links
Italian Army Website: 24° Reggimento Artiglieria Terrestre "Peloritani"

References

Artillery Regiments of Italy